David Ángel Abraham (born 15 July 1986) is an Argentine professional footballer who plays for  Huracán de Chabás as a central defender.

Career

Born in Chabás, Argentina, Abraham began his career with Independiente in 2004, becoming a first-team regular during his first season. At this time, he was called up to the Argentina squad to play at the 2005 FIFA World Youth Championship in the Netherlands. Argentina won the tournament with a squad that included Sergio Agüero, Fernando Gago, and Lionel Messi.

In 2007, Abraham moved to Gimnàstic de Tarragona in the Spanish second division. But after failing to gain promotion to La Liga he left the club.

On 8 July 2008, Swiss champions FC Basel announced that they had signed Abraham on a four-year contract. He joined Basel's first team for their 2008–09 season under head coach Christian Gross. To the beginning of the 2008–09 season Abraham was member of the Basel team that won the Uhrencup. They beat Legia Warsaw 6–1 and Abraham played in the 2–2 draw with Borussia Dortmund to end the table on top slot above Dortmund and Luzern. After playing in two test games Abraham played his domestic league debut for his new club in the away game in the Stadion Wankdorf on 18 July 2008 as Basel won 2–1 against Young Boys.
 
Basel joined the 2008–09 UEFA Champions League in the second qualifying round and with an aggregate score of 5–3 they eliminated IFK Göteborg. In the next round they played against Vitória de Guimarães. The first leg ended in a goalless draw, but with a 2–1 win in the second leg they eliminated Vitória and advanced to the group stage. Here Basel were matched with Barcelona, Sporting CP and Shakhtar Donetsk. Abraham scored his first goal for his new club on 16 September 2008 in the home game in the St. Jakob-Park as Basel were defeated 1–2 by Shakhtar. However, they ended the group in last position winning just one point after a 1–1 draw in Camp Nou. At the end of the 2008–09 Super League season Basel were third in the table, seven points behind new champions Zürich and one adrift of runners-up Young Boys. In the 2008–09 Swiss Cup Basel advanced via Schötz, Bulle, Thun and Zurich to the semi-finals. But here they were stopped by Young Boys. After a goalless 90 minutes and extra time, YB decided the penalty shoot-out 3–2 and advanced to the final to become runners-up, as Sion became cup winners.

Basel joined the 2009–10 UEFA Europa League in the second qualifying round. Basel advanced to the group stage, in which despite winning three of the six games the ended in third position and were eliminated. They finished four points behind group winners Roma and one behind Fulham, against whom they lost 3–2 in the last game of the stage. Abraham had six European appearences. At the end of the 2009–10 season he won the Double with his club. They won the League Championship title with 3 points advantage over second placed Young Boys. Abraham had 21 league appearences. In the Swiss Cup via SC Cham, FC Le Mont, Zürich, FC Biel-Bienne and in the semi-final SC Kriens, Basel advanced to the final, and winning this 6–0 against Lausanne-Sport they won the competition. Abraham had four appearences in the cup

Basel started in the 2010–11 UEFA Champions League third qualifying round and advanced to the group stage, but ended the group in third position. Therefore they dropped to the 2010–11 Europa League knockout phase, but here they were eliminated by Spartak Moscow due to a last minute goal against them. Abraham played in all 12 of theses matches. He scored his first league goal for the team on 24 July 2010 in the last minute of the away game against FC Sion to give his club a 2–1 victory. With Basel, Abraham won his second Swiss Championship at the end of the 2010–11 season, topping the table just one point clear of rivals Zürich.

To the beginning of their 2011–12 season Abraham was member of the Basel team that won the 2011 Uhrencup, beating both Hertha Berlin 3–0 and West Ham United 2–1 to lead the table on goal difference above Young Boys. At the end of the 2011–12 season he won the Double for the second time with his team club. They won the League Championship title with 20 points advantage. In the Swiss Cup Basel advanced to the final, beating FC Eschenbach, Schötz, Wil, Lausanne-Sport and in the semi-final Winterthur. In the final they played against Luzern and the game ended 1–1 after extra time. Basel won the cup by beating their opponents 4–3 in the penalty shootout.

Despite the offer from the club, Abraham did not renew his contract and therefore he left the club. Between the years 2008 and 2012 Abraham played a total of 206 games for Basel scoring a total of 13 goals. 105 of these games were in the Swiss Super League, 11 in the Swiss Cup, 34 in the UEFA competitions (Champions League and Europa League) and 56 were friendly games. He scored eight goals in the domestic league, one in the Champions League and the other four were scored during the test games.

On 29 May 2012, it was confirmed that Abraham has agreed to join Getafe on a four-year contract. In January 2013, Abraham agreed to join German side Hoffenheim, before moving to  Eintracht Frankfurt in 2015. He served as their captain, and was sent off during a match on 10 November 2019 after pushing over SC Freiburg manager Christian Streich. As a result, Abraham was issued a 7 week ban and was fined €25,000 by the German Football Association.

Abraham played his last match for Eintracht Frankfurt on 17 January 2021 in a 3–1 victory against Schalke, following which he returned to Argentina to sign for hometown club Huracán de Chabás.

Honours

Club
Gimnàstic
Copa Catalunya: 2008

Basel
Swiss Super League: 2009–10, 2010–11, 2011–12
Swiss Cup: 2009–10, 2011–12
Uhrencup: 2008, 2011

Eintracht Frankfurt
DFB-Pokal: 2017–18

International
Argentina U20
FIFA U-20 World Cup: 2005

References

External links

  
 
 David Abraham at worldfootball.net
 Primera División Argentina statistics at Fútbol XXI 

1986 births
Living people
Argentina under-20 international footballers
Club Atlético Independiente footballers
Gimnàstic de Tarragona footballers
FC Basel players
TSG 1899 Hoffenheim players
Eintracht Frankfurt players
Swiss Super League players
Bundesliga players
La Liga players
Argentine Primera División players
Argentine expatriate footballers
Argentine footballers
Argentine expatriate sportspeople in Spain
Expatriate footballers in Switzerland
Expatriate footballers in Germany
Association football central defenders
People from Caseros Department
Sportspeople from Santa Fe Province